Elihu may refer to:

People 
Elihu Burritt (1811–1879), American philanthropist, linguist, and social activist
Elihú Chávez (1988), Mexican Environmental Engineer with Renewable Energies Master Degree (ITESM 2019). Safety professional and LGBT+ Activist. 
Elihu Embree (1782–1820), abolitionist and publisher of the first newspaper in the United States devoted exclusively to that cause
Elihu Goodsell (1806–1880), American politician
Elihu Harris (born 1947), mayor of Oakland, California, U.S.
Elihu B. Hayes (1848–1903), American shoe manufacturer, newspaper owner, and politician
Elihu Emory Jackson (1837–1907), governor of Maryland, U.S.
Elihu Katz (born 1926), American and Israeli sociologist
Elihu Lauterpacht (1928–2017), British academic and lawyer
 Elihu Spencer Miller (1817–1879), American Dean of the University of Pennsylvania Law School
Elihu Palmer (1764–1806), founder of the Deistical Society of New York
Elihu Root (1845–1937), American statesman and recipient of the Nobel Peace Prize
Elihu Thomson (1853–1937), engineer instrumental in the founding of electrical companies, and acting president of MIT in 1920
Elihu Vedder (1836–1923), American painter, book illustrator, and poet
Elihu B. Washburne (1816–1887), United States politician and a founder of Republican Party
Elihu Pinson Watkins (1826–1868), American Confederate military officer, politician, and entrepreneur
Elihu S. Williams (1835–1903), American farmer, lawyer, soldier, and politician
Elihu Yale (1649–1721), benefactor of Yale University

Characters 
Judge Elihu Smails, co-founder of the Bushwood Country Club, in the film Caddyshack
Elihu Willsson, a leading character in Dashiell Hammett's  novel Red Harvest
Elihu Yale, the Atlanta Police Chief in Tom Wolfe's novel A Man in Full
Elihu "Sam" Nivens, the protagonist in Robert A. Heinlein's The Puppet Masters
Elihu Whipple, one of the two main characters in the H. P. Lovecraft short story "The Shunned House"

Biblical figures
A speaker who challenges Job in the Book of Job (Chapters 32–37)
an Ephraimite and grandfather to Samuel, mentioned in the First Book of Samuel (1:1)
a brother of David, king of Israel (1 Samuel 16:6)
a chief of the Tribe of Manasseh (1 Chronicles 12:21)
a Korahite (1 Chronicles 26:7)

Other 
Elihu (secret society), a senior society at Yale University
 Elihu Island